Pskov has always played a special role in Russian trade with the West. Archaeological data shows the presence of imported goods in Pskov in the 10th and 11th centuries. This was due to the extensive trade contacts of Russian cities with Scandinavia, which was the source of Russian military elite since the 10th century. Archaeological excavation of Pskov necropolis in 2003 - 2004 revealed a high social status and Scandinavian origin of the buried.  Large variety of around 60 found articles, among them Byzantine coins, bronze and copper items, confirms that Pskov was not an economically isolated region and shows extensive military and trade contacts with both the West and the East. 

Pskov republic started to be recognized as a sovereign state after Treaty of Bolotovo was concluded in 1348, which granted political independence from the Novgorod Republic. This happened just ten years before the establishment of the Hanseatic League - commercial and defensive confederation of merchant guilds and their market towns, which played a major part in Pskov economic development. 
Pskov at that was a veche republic, where all free people were considered its citizens with the right to participate in governing of their city-state, which was expressed in veche assemblies and election of local officials. Because many Pskov dwellers were involved in trade and craft, the share of merchants in the ruling class was high. These merchants then took positions of sotskiys (Russian: сотский, initially, an official who represented a hundred households), izborniks (Russian: изборник, elected officials) and posadniks, which allowed them to participate in the diplomatic talks and stimulate better trade conditions.
This sociopolitical system was a premise for establishing tight economic and political relations with the Hanseatic League.

Relations with Novgorod Republic 

Pskov republic emerged in the course of a tough struggle for independence from Novgorod. 
After Pskov gained its independence, Novgorod had greater advantages in trade with the Hanse. First of all, it was caused by enormous Novgorod resources, which had in its possession vast territories of the Russian North – stretching from the Baltic Sea to the northern Ural Mountains. From its northern colonies Novgorod market received huge quantities of fur, and only part of it was reaching Pskov. Pskov land compared to Novgorod represented small border territories with poor resource base. Thus, Pskov market partially played a transit role that resulted in smaller trade volume, comparing to Novgorod market.

Trade between Pskov and Novgorod in the 11th to 15th centuries was quite intensive. Main trade route between the two cities was along the Cheryokha and Shelon rivers. Two-cities trade affairs can be witnessed in birch bark manuscripts from the 13th century where Pskov merchants asking their Novgorod counterparts to bring squirrel fur skins to Pskov to cover the high demand. These birch bark commercial correspondence is the evidence of well-established trade communication between the two republics, and merchants from both Novgorod and Pskov conducting joint trade operations.

With gaining its independence from Novgorod, Pskov merchants lost their right to trade at Novgorod Torg (market) and were treated as foreign tradesmen. As any other merchants from the Hanseatic League, Pskov businessman could only trade from within their own gostiny dvor (“guest court”) – collections of small shops where merchants from other cities could, at designated times, come to sell their wares: “And Pskovians and Germans with their goods shall trade from their yards“(«А псковичи и немцы с своим товаром ставятся на своих дворех»). This meant that in Novgorod Republic Pskov traders were equal in the trade rights with the German merchants.

Pskov gostiny dvor in Novgorod was noted by its large size. Its length was 60 meters, it had 4 living houses and  41 storehouse. Beside the “guest court” there was set up the “Linen ryad” - row of merchant stalls where linen and hemp brought from Pskov lands were sold in large quantities. Administration of gostiny dvor provided order and adjudicated legal disputes between Russian and foreign merchants. There was a pier on the Volkhov River where merchants could sell their goods without unloading their boats.

The establishment of Pskov gostiny dvor in Novgorod was an important condition for establishing trade relations with eastern territories. Pskov merchant caravans reached Upper Volga cities: Rzhev, Tver, Yaroslavl, but preferred to not venture further east as long journeys and high logistic expenses – duties paid when crossing multiple administrative border made such voyages economically unviable.

Relations with the Hanseatic League 

The establishment of diplomatic and trade relations between Pskov republic and Hansa was predestined by its geographical location, political system and its independence from Novgorod and Russia. 
Pskov was trading with many Hanseatic cities – Lübeck, Danzig, Riga, but most of all with Reval and Dorpat. Riga, Revel and Dorpat were part of Teutonic Order in Livonia, or as it often called - Livonian Order – confederation of Order dominions, church lands and Free imperial cities (Freistadt). Pskov has also traded with Narva – the big Livonian city which was not part of the Hanseatic League. Narva's proximity to Novgorod contributed to the rapid growth of its trade significance. Narva traded with Novgorod and Pskov even during the bitterest of Russian-Hanseatic relations.

According to the earliest written records of 1228 Pskov had peace agreements with its western neighbors and even refused Novgorod calls to go to war with Livonian Riga, showing their independence from Novgorod in their foreign affairs. In the same records could have been some clauses regarding the ways to resolve economic disputes between merchants.

Although, in 1242 Novgorod has reestablished its control over Pskov, Pskovians kept their independence in economic relations with the Hanseatic city-states. 
Despite numerous military conflicts between Novgorod and Livonian cities which were disturbing peace in the region, Pskovians preferred to continue economic affairs with Hansa. 
In the 15th century Pskov-Hanseatic economic relations were disrupted after signing the Treaty of Salynas in 1398, which led to Pskov-Livonian wars in 1406-1409. 
Although Novgorod supported Pskov in these wars, Pskovians most of the time preferred to continue trade with the West. At one point, Novgorod responded by stopping all the traffic from the West via Pskov route, turning caravans back to Pskov and suggesting to use “official” Novgorod trade route via Narva.
In 1417 Pskov signed an agreement with Livonian order which aside from military neutrality pact
had clauses concerning free trade and diplomatic relations.

Arms trade with the veche republics was very profitable for the Hanseatic merchants. In fact, it was so profitable that during Novgorod - Livonian wars in the 1420s, Hanseatic merchants continued to smuggle arms and metals to Novgorod and Pskov despite Livonian prohibition of such trade.

Until the 16th century Pskov didn't have a dedicated German gostiny dvor, but since as early as the 13th century German merchants occupied a special place in Pskov where they rented houses and storage for their goods. This place was called the "German riverside" (“немецкий берег”).

Hanseatic cities of the Baltic region didn’t have a dedicated space for Pskov merchants similar to Hanseatic “guest courts” in Russian cities for the merchants from the Hansa. Russian Orthodox churches in Livonian cities became the “lodgement” for Russian merchants trade operations, providing place to store the goods. Also, merchants used churches for their gatherings and celebrations. In return, merchants supported the churches financially by providing donations. 
The Russian merchants rented houses around these churches, so the neighborhoods around were called “Russian end” (Russian area).

In the 1430s as the Hanseatic influence in Northern Europe was declining due to the rapid development of the Netherlands and the center of Hansa-Novgorod trade shifted to Livonian cities. The importance of the Pskov Republic grew due to its location between Novgorod and Livonia.

In 1474 Dorpat and Pskov signed a very detailed trade agreement which regulated trade relations between Pskov and Dorpat merchants. The agreement guaranteed the free passage of goods for both sides, abolished duties and customs control. This agreement was beneficial for Pskov, because now Pskovians could trade not only with Dorpat citizens but also with traders from Riga, Reval and all “Dorpat guests”. The document regulated in detail quality control and weighing of the goods.

After the execution of two Russian merchants in Livonian Reval in 1494, 20-year conflict started between Russia and the Hansa.  Ivan III, the Grand Prince of Moscow, responded to the execution by closing down the Hansa Kontor in Novgorod, arresting 49 Hanseatic merchants, seizing their goods and banning the import of salt from the Hansa. Pskov merchants tried to lift this ban and supply Russian cities with Hanseatic salt, but did not succeed. Although Pskov continued to trade with the West, it did not benefit significantly from the disruption of Hansa-Novgorod trade.

By the end of the 15th century and until the end of Pskov independence, the leading role in Russian-Livonian trade shifted from Novgorod to Pskov. In 1509 Pskov signed a 14-year trade agreement with Livonia. It was the last foreign policy document signed by independent Pskov. It granted Pskov merchants free trade access to Livonian cities.

Commodities 
At the time of the Pskov Republic furs were the main Russian export, however the Pskovian production was small compared to the Novgorod.
In the 14th and 15th centuries wax became the main Pskov exported product. Wax was very important in the Medieval Europe as the raw material for candles used in lighting and religious ceremonies. Western Europe could not produce enough wax to satisfy the demand and had to buy it from the East where honey hunting was well developed due to the abundance of forests. Hanseatic traders were not allowed to buy poor quality wax from Pskov. Wax was filtered by melting, “packed” in wheels, weighed and its weight was sealed on the wheel. Salo (cured slabs of fatback) was another important export commodity. A dedicated quality control facility was organized in Dorpat to test the imported salo from Pskov. 

One of the most valuable imported commodities for Pskovians was salt as Russia was unable to satisfy its demand with domestically produced salt. Hanseatic traders sold salt not by weight but by bags which often led to fraud. At the same time in the Hanseatic cities salt was sold by weight. Another important products imported from Hansa to Pskov and Russia were Western European-made textile and metals (silver and nonferrous metals). Some types of food were also brought from the West and sold in Pskov such as herring and wine. Ingredients for medicine (for example thyme) also had great significance in Pskov-Hansa trade. A significant part of the trade flows in the Middle Ages consisted of alcoholic beverages. While wine was expensive and was imported in small volume, beer and mead at the same time were imported heavily. Mead was also produced in Pskov and Novgorod and exported to Dorpat.

Barley, oats, wheat, hemp and flax were grown in the Pskov land. The chronicles record instances of poor harvests and high prices caused by rains and frosts and years when in spite of adverse weather enough grain was stored in the Krom and the prices remained low. In 1420-22 there was a famine in other Russian principalities and many people came to Pskov seeking to buy bread.

Currency  

Until the 15th century Pskov used grivnas along with Arabic, Western European and Byzantine coins. According to Pskov Chronicles in 1409 Pskovians started to use German pfennig in trade with the Hansa. Between themselves they continue to use marten snouts as petty cash.  In 1425 Pskov started to mint its own silver coin called pskovka.

The main currency used in the trade between Hanseatic cities in the 16th century was the thaler – a heavy (29 grams) high-quality silver coin which was minted in German cities, most of them in Bohemian Joachimsthal after which thalers in Pskov and Novgorod were called “efimki”. In the Pskov-Hansa trade thalers minted in Lübeck were used most often. Until the 17th century exchange thaler rate was 1:36 (36 kopeks for 1 thaler). In the first half of the 17th century one thaler was equal to 100 denga (1/2 ruble). Golden coins were rarely used in the Baltic trade. These rare coins were mostly 3.4 gram golden ducatss minted in Hungary. Large part of trade operations were conducted using credit system, but in the absence of bank loans merchants gave their counterparty promissory notes which then were the basis for the right to demand repayment.

References

Sources 
 Bolkhovitinov E.A. "History of Pskov principality with the attached map of Pskov town: Part I", Kiev 1831.
 Arakcheev V.A. "Pskov and the Hansa during the Middle Ages", Pskov 2012.
 The Pskov 3rd Chronicles.
 Great Novgorod and Pskov Manuscripts.

External links 
 History of Pskov principality with the attached map of Pskov town
 Pskov and the Hansa during the Middle Ages
 The Pskov 3rd Chronicle

Pskov Republic